Salty is the second album by the New Zealand rock band The Mutton Birds, released in 1994. Four songs — "The Heater", "Anchor Me", "In My Room" and "Ngaire" — reached the top 20 in the New Zealand singles chart with "The Heater" reaching No.1.

"Don't Fight it, Marsha, It's Bigger Than Both of Us" was originally recorded by an earlier band of McGlashan's, Blam Blam Blam. "The Heater" is used as a plot device in the Christopher Brookmyre novel Be My Enemy; two central characters bond over it, and it is used as a contrast against the manufactured pop music made by a minor villain.

Track listing
(All songs by Don McGlashan except where noted)
"The Heater" – 4.22
"Ngaire" – 3.52
"When the Wind Comes Round" – 5.30
"You Will Return" – 4.32
"Wellington" (Alan Gregg) – 3.07
"In My Room" – 4.35
"Queen's English" – 7.07
"Salty My Dear"  – 1.22
"There's a Limit" (Gregg) – 4.13
"Esther" (Gregg) – 2.45
"No Telling When"  – 5.28
"Anchor Me"  – 4.27
"Too Close to the Sun"  – 5.31
"Don't Fight It Marsha. It's Bigger Than Both of Us" – 4.38

Personnel
Don McGlashan – guitars, vocals, euphonium, melodica
Ross Burge – drums, autoharp
Alan Gregg – bass guitar, vocals, keyboards
David Long – guitar, vocals, keyboards, banjo

Additional personnel
Jane Dodd — backing vocals ("Anchor Me", "Queens English")

References

The Mutton Birds albums
1994 albums